FC Slovan Liberec, commonly referred to as Slovan Liberec or simply Slovan, is a Czech football club based in the city of Liberec. The club is one of the most successful in the Czech Republic, having won three league titles and the domestic cup since 1993. Glass-making company Preciosa a.s. is the current main sponsor of the club.

History

The Early Years
The first predecessor of the Liberec football club was the Reichenberger Fussballklub (RFK) which was founded in 1899 (renamed to Reichenberger Sportklub [RSK] in 1904). Because Liberec was a city where the majority of inhabitants were of German nationality, until 1945, it was Germans who first established clubs and played their own league. The first Czech football club, SK Liberec, was established after World War I on 11 May 1919. In 1922, the original German club FK Rapid Ober Rosenthal became the Czech club SK Rapid Horní Růžodol. In the same year, another Liberec-based club – SK Doubí – was established, followed by AFK Stráž bezpečnosti in 1931. On 27 February 1934, SK Liberec took on the new name of Slavia Liberec so that the Czech footballers could affirm their club's Slavic character at a time when the Nazi regime in neighbouring Germany already represented a serious threat to the former Czechoslovakia as well as all of Europe.

The rivalry that once existed in Liberec between Rapid and Slavia can be compared to a smaller version of the rivalry between Prague's two most famous clubs, Sparta and Slavia. In 1938, the Munich Agreement was signed, in which representatives of the United Kingdom, France, Italy and Germany forced Czechoslovakia to withdraw from their border area and surrender it to Germany. After the city of Liberec was incorporated into the Third Reich, Czech football in the city came to a halt for a full seven years.

Post-War Era
At the end of World War II and with the liberation of Czechoslovakia in 1945, Liberec took on the character of a Czech city. The first post-war game was played in Turnov on 10 June 1945 by Liberec's football club Slavia. On 15 July 1945, representatives of Czech football clubs from the border areas that had started up again met at the Radnice hotel. The result of the meeting was the verdict that each border-area club continue in the same league that it had played in up until 1938. After seven years of forced inactivity, Slavia Liberec was again included in Class I A and Rapid Horní Růžodol in Class II. In February 1948, the Communists seized power in Czechoslovakia. Under the new name of Kolora, Rapid Liberec, formerly Horní Růžodol, fought its way to be promoted to the Czechoslovak First League. Due to the poorly thought-out restructuring of Czechoslovak physical education and sports, Kolora remained in the second league – yet an administrative decision placed Slavoj Liberec, originally established as Čechie, in the First League. At the time, Slavoj had only played in the regional league. This reorganization created a lot of  bad blood in Liberec. After one season, Slavoj was relegated to the second league. Three years later, Kolora once again battled its way up to be promoted to the First League, but the team could not manage to save themselves from relegation the following season. Whenever Kolora, which later played under the name of Jiskra, met up with Slavoj Liberec, the match was always important and a rough battle to the end.

Establishment of Slovan
In 1958, the decision was taken to close the Jiskra and Slavoj clubs and merge the two into a single team that would have the potential to win a spot in the First League. Although this plan stirred up very negative reactions among footballers and fans alike and despite the fact that members of Slavoj originally declared that they reject the plan, in the end they changed their minds. As a result, TJ Slovan Liberec was formed on 12 July 1958. With this name, the football club affirmed the Czech character of the club as well as the region where it played. The very first competitor the newly created team faced was Spartak Praha Sokolovo, as the famous team Sparta Prague was called at the time. Slovan lost 0–3. Despite all its efforts, for a long time Slovan Liberec was unsuccessful in its fight for a place in the First League. At certain stages of its history, it was even relegated to the regional division or third league.

In the 1970s, Slovan managed to be promoted back to the second league, which at the time included five Bohemian, one Moravian and ten Slovak teams. Due to the vast distances, the footballers from Liberec even had to board planes to play against teams in Bardejov or Michalovce, located in the eastern parts of the country. In 1971, Slovan again failed in its attempt to be promoted to the First League. Following this were two relegations and promotions back to the second league.

Modern times

After overcoming the financial crisis the club found itself in following the 1989 Velvet Revolution, Slovan Liberec finally had the chance to gain promotion to the top league. Following the dissolution of Czechoslovakia, the six best teams in the second league were elevated to the newly created Czech First League. Slovan ascended to the first league with the formation of the Czech First League in 1993, and has maintained this position ever since. In the 1990s, the club achieved a series of mid-table finishes.

In 2002, under the management of Ladislav Škorpil, Slovan Liberec became the first champions of the Czech Republic outside Prague. As Czech champions, the club entered the UEFA Champions League third qualifying round, but lost their first tie to that season's eventual tournament winners Milan (0–1, 2–1). Subsequently, the team finished fourth in the league in 2002–03. Due to a league-wide corruption scandal in the 2004–05 season, the club was penalised with a six-point deduction and finished in fifth position with 46 points. In the 2005–06 season, Slovan recovered to achieve their second league title, confirmed their status as the leading Czech club outside Prague and broke the dominance of Sparta Prague and Slavia Prague.

In June 2007, popular coach Vítězslav Lavička resigned amidst problems with club management and disappointment with the team's Champions League qualification loss to Spartak Moscow. Liberec entered the UEFA Cup first round, where they defeated Serbian champions Red Star Belgrade before being eliminated in the group stage. Performances next season under coach Michal Zach would not meet the expectations of the club owners, and Slovan experienced one of the worst seasons in its modern history. Zach's replacement by former coach Ladislav Škorpil failed to remedy the situation, as the club finished sixth in the league. In the same season, the team reached the final of the Czech Cup, but lost in a penalty shootout against Sparta Prague.

The 2008–09 season began with bitter European defeat in the UEFA Cup, as Slovan lost their second qualifying round tie to Slovak club MŠK Žilina. By contrast, the club began their domestic league season with positive results against both of the dominant Prague sides, beating champions Slavia Prague 2–1 and Sparta Prague 3–0. However, a series of poor results against average opposition left the club down in fifth place by the fall. The spring saw Slovan opt for a more offensive approach and brought an improvement in results, with the club winning a derby against local rival Baumit Jablonec and beating an ambitious Mladá Boleslav side by three goals. Croatian striker Andrej Kerić scored 15 goals and became the league's top scorer as the club finished third, qualifying for the newly rebranded UEFA Europa League for the 2009–10 season. In the 2011–12 season, Slovan became league champions for the third time in club history.

Names and crest

TJ (Tělovýchovná Jednota) Slovan Liberec was created in 1958. Since then the club's name has been changed on numerous occasions, reflecting changes in sponsorship. In the 1980s the club used the name TJ Slovan Elitex (a textile company) Liberec. In 1993 the name FC (Football Club) Slovan Liberec was announced, to be replaced later the same year with FC Slovan WSK Liberec (WSK was an abbreviation for Wimpey Severokámen). Only one year later in 1994, it became FC Slovan WSK Vratislav (Vratislav – a beer brand) Liberec. In 1995 Slovan returned to its former name, FC Slovan Liberec.

The crest represents the colours of Liberec (blue & white) and the mountain Ještěd near Liberec with its famous television tower on top.

Players

Current squad

Out on loan

Notable former players

Player records in the Czech First League
.
Highlighted players are in the current squad.

Most appearances

Most goals

Most clean sheets

Managers

 Vlastimil Petržela (1992–95)
 Ladislav Škorpil (1998–04)
 Josef Csaplár (2001–03)
 Stanislav Griga (Jan 2003 – June 2005)
 Vítězslav Lavička (2004–07)
 Michal Zach (July 2007 – Oct 2007)
 Ladislav Škorpil (Oct 2007 – Nov 2009)
 Josef Petřík (Nov 2009 – Nov 2010)
 Petr Rada (Nov 2010 – June 2011)
 Jaroslav Šilhavý (July 2011 – April 2014)
 David Vavruška (April 2014 – June 2014)
 Samuel Slovák (June 2014 – Dec 2014)
 Jiří Kotrba, Josef Csaplár (Dec 2014 – March 2015)
 David Vavruška (March 2015 – May 2015)
 Jindřich Trpišovský (June 2015 – Dec 2017)
 David Holoubek (Dec 2017 – May 2018)
 Zsolt Hornyák (June 2018 – May 2019)
 Pavel Hoftych (June 2019 – August 2021)
 Luboš Kozel (August 2021 – present)

History in domestic competitions

 Seasons spent at Level 1 of the football league system: 28
 Seasons spent at Level 2 of the football league system: 0
 Seasons spent at Level 3 of the football league system: 0
 Seasons spent at Level 4 of the football league system: 0

Czech Republic

Notes:
† six points deducted

History in European competitions

UEFA club coefficient ranking
After 2018/19 season, Source:

Honours
 Czech First League
 Winners (3): 2001–02, 2005–06, 2011–12
 Czech Cup
 Winners (2): 1999–2000, 2014–15
 UEFA Cup
 Quarter-finals: 2001–02
 UEFA Intertoto Cup
 Finals: 2004

Club records

Czech First League records
Best position: 1st (2001–02, 2005–06, 2011–12)
Worst position: 12th (2014–15)
Biggest home win: Liberec 6–0 Ostrava (2014–15)
Biggest away win: Benešov 0–5 Liberec (1994–95)
Biggest home defeat: Liberec 0–4 Olomouc (2009–10)
Biggest away defeat: Sparta Prague 7–1 Liberec (1994–95), Plzeň 6–0 Liberec (2013–14)

References

External links

 
Official Youtube channel 
Official fans website 

 
Football clubs in the Czech Republic
Association football clubs established in 1958
Liberec, Slovan
Liberec, Slovan
Sport in Liberec
1958 establishments in Czechoslovakia